Bush Baby is an album by jazz saxophonist Arthur Blythe which was recorded in December 1977 and released in 1978 on the Adelphi label.

Reception
The AllMusic review by Scott Yanow states: "Blythe had an original sound from the start and his soulful yet adventurous and intense style is heard in its early prime".

Track listing
All compositions by Arthur Blythe
 "Mamie Lee" - 10:32  
 "For Fats" - 8:43  
 "Off The Top" - 8:20  
 "Bush Baby" - 9:07  
Recorded at Blank Tapes Recording Studio in New York City in December 1977.

Personnel
Arthur Blythe - alto saxophone 
Ahkmed Abdullah - congas
Bob Stewart - tuba
Dan Doyle and Arthur Blythe - producers
Bob Blank - recording engineer
Dan Doyle and Gene Rosenthal - mix engineers
Ron Warwell - cover illustration and design
Candace - rear cover layout and design
Gene Rosenthal - photography
W. A. Brower - liner notes

References

1978 albums
Adelphi Records albums
Arthur Blythe albums